When a Guitar Plays the Blues is a studio album by American singer and guitarist Roy Lee Johnson. It was released on August 18, 1998, by Southern Tracks Records.

Track listing

Personnel 
 Roy Lee Johnson – lead guitar and vocals
 Keith Samuels – bass guitar, electric and acoustic guitars and digital drums
 James Meadows – piano, strings and horns
 Larry Hall – electric and acoustic guitar
 Paul Linden – harmonica on "Too Much Hooch"
 Ron Harville – bass guitar

Technical staff
 Jeffery Alphabet – engineering, mixing
 Rodney Mills – mastering

Notes

External links 
 When a Guitar Plays the Blues at Discogs

1998 albums
Blues albums by American artists